Heterakidae is a family of nematodes belonging to the order Ascaridida.

Genera
Genera:
 Africana Travassos, 1920
 Bufonerakis Baker, 1980
 Cagourakis Petter, Chermette & Vassart, 1988
 Haroldakis Inglis, 1991
 Hatterianema Chabaud & Dollfus, 1966
 Heterakis Dujardin, 1845
 Kiwinema Inglis & Harris, 1990
 Meteterakis Karve, 1930
 Moaciria Teixeira de Freitas, 1956
 Musserakis Hasegawa, Dewi & Asakawa, 2014-04
 Neoheterakis Kumar & Thienpont, 1974
 Odontoterakis Skrjabin & Schikhobalova, 1947
 Pseudostrongyluris Guerrero, 1971
 Spinicauda Travassos, 1920
 Strongyluris Müller, 1894

References

Nematodes